Brittany Hogan (born 19 September 1998) is an Irish rugby player from Killinchy, Co Down. She plays for Old Belvedere, Ulster, the Ireland women's national rugby union team and the Ireland women's national rugby sevens team. She graduated from DCU with a First class honours in sports science and health in February 2022.

Club career 
Hogan began playing rugby in her local club, Ballynahinch RFC, at the age of 16.

She has been capped by Ulster at all age grades and was part of the Ulster team that won the first Ireland U18 Interprovincial Series in 2016.

She played one season with Cooke RFC and, when she moved to Dublin to study in 2018, joined All-Ireland League club Old Belvedere RFC.

International career 
Hogan got a professional contract with Irish Rugby Union's Sevens programme in August 2017 and made her debut in the World Rugby Sevens Series in Dubai in 2018, scoring a try against New Zealand on her first day on the series.

She debuted for the Ireland women's VXs in October 2020, as a replacement against Italy, in the final game of the 2020 Women's Six Nations.

In the 2021 Women's Six Nations she was a replacement against Wales and England and got her first Test start in the third-place playoff against Italy which Ireland won 25-5. In the 2022 TikTok Women’s Six Nations Championship she started at number 8 against both Wales and France. Brittany earned her 10th cap against Italy where Ireland won 29-08.

She was selected for the Ireland women's national rugby sevens team for the 2021-2022 season. She is a regular member of the World Series 7s squad and was a part of the history making team in Seville 2022, achieving 2nd place.

Personal life 
Hogan graduated Dublin City University with a First class honours in sports science and health in 2022. She is a qualified Level 1 and 2 coach in rugby and hockey. Hogan is a ‘Tackle Your Feelings’ Campaign Ambassador in collaboration with Rugby Players Ireland and a mental health advocate.

Before specialising in rugby Hogan played hockey with North Down Hockey club and her school, Down High School, where she was also Head Girl. Hogan played ladies gaelic football for the RGU club and captained the Down U14 ladies gaelic football team.

Honours 

 .

References

External links 
 https://www.irishrugby.ie/women/brittany-hogan/

Living people
1998 births
Irish female rugby union players